Phil Williams (born July 12, 1977) is an American cruiserweight  professional boxer.  Williams was born in Queens, New York City. He moved to Minneapolis, Minnesota as a child, and still lives in Minneapolis where he works as a barber.

Amateur career
Williams claims to have compiled an amateur record of 31-4.

Professional career
Williams made his professional debut in April 2006 with a first-round TKO defeat of Jason Medina.  Williams won his first eight bouts, all by knockout or TKO, losing for the first time to 14-0-1 Marcus Oliveira in August 2008.  In that fight Williams knocked Oliveira down in the third and sixth rounds, but ran out of gas and was knocked out in the seventh round of an eight-round bout.  To date Williams has compiled a professional record of 15-8-2 with 14 knockouts.

On February 27, 2016, Williams was knocked out by rising prospect Michael Hunter in the first round.

Professional boxing record

Notes

External links
 Phil Williams: Boxrec
 Williams knocks out Marcus Upshaw (two videos):  

1977 births
Living people
Cruiserweight boxers
Light-heavyweight boxers
Super-middleweight boxers
Boxers from Minnesota
American male boxers